Cheongoksan is a mountain in the county of Bonghwa, Gyeongsangbuk-do in South Korea.

See also
List of mountains in Korea

Notes

References
  

Mountains of South Korea
Mountains of North Gyeongsang Province
Bonghwa County
One-thousanders of South Korea

zh:青玉山 (庆尚北道)